Martin Hess (born 6 February 1987) is a German footballer who plays for FSV Friedrichshaller.

References

 Martin Hess on Fupa

1987 births
Living people
German footballers
VfB Stuttgart II players
Eintracht Frankfurt players
Eintracht Frankfurt II players
SV Wacker Burghausen players
Sportfreunde Lotte players
SV Waldhof Mannheim players
Bundesliga players
3. Liga players
Association football forwards
Sportspeople from Heilbronn
Footballers from Baden-Württemberg